The 1994 NCAA Division I-AA football season, part of college football in the United States organized by the National Collegiate Athletic Association at the Division I-AA level, began in August 1994, and concluded with the 1994 NCAA Division I-AA Football Championship Game on December 17, 1994, at Marshall University Stadium in Huntington, West Virginia. The defending champion Youngstown State Penguins won their third I-AA championship, defeating the Boise State Broncos by a score of 28−14. It was the fourth consecutive year that Youngstown State played in the I-AA title game.

Conference changes and new programs

Conference standings

Conference champions

Postseason

NCAA Division I-AA playoff bracket
Only the top four teams in the bracket were seeded. The site of the title game, Marshall University Stadium, had been determined in March 1994.

* By team name denotes host institution

* By score denotes overtime periods

Source:

References